Mario Spinetti (1848–1925) was an Italian painter, whose works depict mythologic, Neo-Pompeian, and sacred subjects. He was born and resident in Rome. Among his works: a half-figure, Lidia, in 1881 in Milan. At the 1883 Exposition of Fine Arts in Rome, he exhibited a painting titled: Virginibus puerisque canto. In 1884 in Turin, he exhibited: Marriage in the 16th century. In 1887, in Venice, he exhibited: . In 1899, he painted frescoes of Sain Zaccaria, John the Baptist, and Elisabeth and Faith and Charity in the apse of the church of San Giovanni Battista dei Genovesi in Rome.

References

1848 births
1925 deaths
Painters from Rome
19th-century Italian painters
Italian male painters
20th-century Italian painters
Neo-Pompeian painters
19th-century Italian male artists
20th-century Italian male artists